Mount Selwyn is a mountain that is part of the Victorian Alps of the Great Dividing Range, located in the Alpine National Park in the Australian state of Victoria.

See also

List of mountains in Victoria

References

Mountains of Victoria (Australia)
Victorian Alps
Mountains of Hume (region)